Traffic signs, installations, and symbols used in Germany are prescribed by the Road Traffic Regulations (StVO) and the Traffic Signs Catalog (VzKat).

§§ 39 to 43 of the StVO regulate the effect of traffic signs and installations. Annexes 1 to 3 illustrate most danger, regulatory, and directional signs and annex 4 illustrates the traffic installations. Other traffic signs and installations not specified in the StVO, primarily specific supplementary signs, are published in the VzKat.

The VzKat was issued in May 2017 under the General Administrative Rules for the Road Traffic Regulations (VwV-StVO).

All signs have assigned numbers. The suffix number after the hyphen refers to the variation of the sign; the suffix on signs with variable numbers is the number depicted on the sign (for speed limits, maximum heights, etc.).

Symbols 
Symbols pursuant to § 39 paragraphs 7, 10, and 11 of the StVO:

Danger signs 
Danger signs pursuant to part 2 of the VzKat which includes permissible variations of signs listed in annex 1 of the StVO. When one sign has two sign numbers, the first number is the illustrated sign while the latter number is a mirrored or slightly altered version of the sign.

Regulatory signs 
Regulatory signs pursuant to part 3 of the VzKat which includes permissible variations of signs listed in annex 2 of the StVO. When one sign has two sign numbers, the first number is the illustrated sign while the latter number is a mirrored or slightly altered version of the sign.

Directional signs 
Directional signs pursuant to part 4 of the VzKat which includes permissible variations of signs listed in annex 4 of the StVO. When one sign has two sign numbers, the first number is the illustrated sign while the latter number is a mirrored or slightly altered version of the sign.

Road equipment

Additional road signs

Priority 
"Zipper rule" for one-way traffic merging & two-way traffic priorities

Environmental factors 
Yield as necessary to not endanger themselves or other road users

Traffic priority – priority roads 

Priority traffic does not yield, signal all turns

Other factors 
Yield or reduce speed as necessary

Vehicle classifications & specifics 
Official (base) Symbols in Germany as per Straßenverkehrs-Ordnung (StVO) § 39 Verkehrszeichen

Basic 

Red ring

In addition to any sign/placard, the red ring forbids (in general) the item noted and anything of greater size or value; i.e., if a car is pictured, then not only are cars not permitted but trucks, as well.

A red ring is also a traffic sign itself: No vehicles (of any type) permitted, pushing motorcycles/mopeds/bicycles permitted

Bicycles & mopeds

Motorcycles 
Classified as above/below 500 cc motor size, and with or without sidecar

Cars/automobiles 
Personenkraftwagen – Pkw – "Powered car for (the transport of) persons"; e.g., cars/automobiles

Recreational vehicles, farm equipment or animal powered

Trucks & lorries 
 – (literally "powered car for loads", e.g., truck, lorry, semi, tractor-trailer)

Kraftfahrzeuge (Kfz) mit einer zulässigen Gesamtmasse über 3,5 t, einschließlich ihrer Anhänger, und Zugmaschinen, ausgenommen Personenkraftwagen und Kraftomnibusse – Motor vehicles with a maximum authorized mass of more than 3,5 t, including their trailers, and tractors other than cars and buses

Restrictions & allowances for vehicles (generally larger) than cars

Dangerous or hazardous cargos

Buses, public transit & rail 
Buses (generally) and trains (always) have the priority/right-of-way

Others

Primary road classifications & related signs

Basics 

 Basic Traffic Controls 

 Speed Controls & Limits 

 Passing & Overtaking 

 Other

Autobahn 

 German Limited Access Highway  – Blue Background

Signs used on Autobahn

Signs leading to Autobahn

other signs

Signs of federal highways

Note: Though road design of Kraftfahrstraße is comparable to Autobahn, speed limit is mandatory, signposting is similar but has yellow background.

Bundesstraße – non-limited access highways or main roads – yellow background

Urban or built-up areas

Paved surfaces – "edge-to-edge" controls

Fahrtbahn/Streifen – driving lane controls 
Roadway lanes delineated by lines for/of single vehicle width

Dedicated lane use required for ...

Special zones

Stopping, waiting, parking 
Parking is considered any stop exceeding three minutes.

Absolutely no stopping or waiting on traffic lanes (emergency excepted)

No waiting/standing longer than 3 minutes on traffic lanes – "Loading/unloading & pick-up/drop-off zone"

Bus stop and taxi zones

Road markings/lines 

Intersections & Crosswalks

Driving Lanes

Information signs

Informational signs

Base traffic symbols

Standardized traffic symbols 

Arrows

Road equipment

Retired signs 

 Obsolete signs since 2017 

 Obsolete signs since 2013

Old signs

Warning signs

Regulatory signs

Information signs

Signs for traffic diversion

References

External links 
 

Germany
Road transport in Germany